John Henry Yorkey (October 4, 1856 - January 30, 1907) was an American politician. He was elected to the Wisconsin State Assembly in 1897.

Biography
Yorkey was born on October 4, 1856 in Ava, New York. He moved to Fredonia, Wisconsin in 1885.

Career
Yorkey was a member of the Assembly in 1897. He was a Republican.

References

1856 births
1907 deaths
People from Oneida County, New York
People from Fredonia, Wisconsin
Republican Party members of the Wisconsin State Assembly